Anne-Marie Deschodt, married name de Rougemont, (18 August 1938 – 21 September 2014, Marsillargues) was a French actress and writer.

She was writer Éric Deschodt's sister.

Her first husband was Giancarlo Uzielli, and then, from 1965 to 1967, she was married to French film director Louis Malle. From the 1980s, she was the wife of artist Guy du Temple de Rougemont.

She died at 76 years old.

Filmography

Cinema 
1969:  (Short, by Jean-Claude Carrière) - Marie-Claude
1973: The Discreet Charm of the Bourgeoisie (by Luis Buñuel)
1973: Shock Treatment (by Alain Jessua) - Lise de Riberolle
1974: The Phantom of Liberty (by Luis Buñuel) - Édith Rosenblum
1974: La Jeune Fille assassinée (by Roger Vadim) - Éliane
1976:  (by Yannick Bellon) - l'inconnue
1976: Game of Seduction (by Roger Vadim) - La duchesse de Volnay
1977: Sorcerer (by William Friedkin) - Blanche
1978: La Jument vapeur (by Joyce Buñuel)
1978: Utopia by  - Catherine

Television 
1976: Les Cinq Dernières Minutes (téléfilm, Le pied à l'étrier, by ) - Barbara
1978:  (telefilm, La femme rompue, by Josée Dayan) - Noëllie Guérard
1981:  (by Yannick Andréi, mini-serial) - L'assistante d'Eliphas (final film role)

Works 
 1978: Les Belles Années, cowritten with Anne-Marie Cazalis, novel, Mercure de France
 1979: Mariano Fortuny : un magicien de Venise, éditions du Regard

References

External links 
 Anne-Marie DESCHODT on Notre cinéma
 

20th-century French actresses
2014 deaths
1938 births